The Association of African Sports Confederations (acronym: AASC; , UCSA) is an international organization for sports in Africa. It is currently headquartered in Abuja, Nigeria. It shall carry out its activities through the General Assembly, which shall be the supreme organ and the Executive Bureau, which shall be the executive organ. It also may set up, if need be, permanent specialised or ad hoc committees to assist it in the discharge of its duties.

History
The Association of African Sports Confederations was founded on 23 July 1983 in Abidjan, Ivory Coast. Actually, the headquarters is located in Yaoundé, Cameroon.

Confederations members

References

External links
[https://www.ucsa-aasc.org/enhttp://[http://www.ucsa-aasc.org/ www.ucsa-aasc.org/]/en Official website] 

Olympic organizations
Sports Confederations
1983 establishments in Africa
Sports organizations established in 1983